Pisaurina is a genus of nursery web spiders that was first described by Eugène Louis Simon in 1898. It likes to live within vegetated areas such as meadows, bushes or tall grass, preferring warm or tropical areas to settle down and reproduce.

Species
 it contains four species, found only in Canada,  the United States, and on the Greater Antilles:
Pisaurina brevipes (Emerton, 1911) – USA, Canada
Pisaurina dubia (Hentz, 1847) – USA
Pisaurina mira (Walckenaer, 1837) (type) – USA, Canada
Pisaurina undulata (Keyserling, 1887) – USA, Cuba

See also
 List of Pisauridae species

References

Araneomorphae genera
Pisauridae
Spiders of North America